The Belgian League Cup was a Belgian association football cup created in 1973. The competition was held from 1973 by eleven clubs wanting to increase professionalism in Belgian football but lasted only three seasons before being disbanded. The tournament was then revived the first time in 1986 for one season and finally a second time in 1998 for three seasons. In 2000, due to disagreements over television rights, combined with poor attendances and a lack of interest from the top clubs, the trophy was cancelled after the 2000–01 edition. At that time the winners of the tournament qualified for the UEFA Intertoto Cup.

League Cup finals

Notes

External links
 Belgium - List of Cup Finals, RSSSF.com
 Foot 100 Archive

League Cup
Belgium
Recurring sporting events established in 1973
Recurring events disestablished in 2000
1973 establishments in Belgium
2000 disestablishments in Belgium